Conemaugh Dam (also known as Conemaugh River Dam or Conemaugh River Lake Dam) is a concrete gravity dam across the Conemaugh River, near the town of Saltsburg, in Pennsylvania. The dam was authorized by the Flood Control Act of 1936 and completed in 1952 by the U.S. Army Corps of Engineers for flood protection on the Conemaugh, Kiskiminetas, and Allegheny Rivers. The dam is one of 16 flood control structures in the Corps' Pittsburgh District.

Water is released as quickly as possible while not exacerbating flooding conditions downstream. The dam has prevented a total of $2.2 billion of flooding-related damages between 1952 and 2013, including $375 million during 2004's Hurricane Ivan alone. The dam also supplies water to a 14 MW hydroelectric power station which was commissioned in 1989.

Conemaugh Lake National Recreation Area is located adjacent to the dam and preserves several historic sites, including segments of the Main Line Canal that once connected Pittsburgh to Philadelphia.

See also

List of dams and reservoirs in Pennsylvania

References

Dams in Pennsylvania
Dams completed in 1952
Gravity dams
Buildings and structures in Indiana County, Pennsylvania
Energy infrastructure completed in 1989
Hydroelectric power plants in Pennsylvania
Buildings and structures in Westmoreland County, Pennsylvania